The 2007–08 Kent Football League season was the 42nd in the history of Kent Football League a football competition in England.

League table

The league featured 16 clubs which competed in the previous season, along with one new club:
Holmesdale, joined from the Kent County League

League table

References

External links

2007-08
9